This page lists the major power stations located in Guangdong Province.

Non-renewable

Coal

Gas

Nuclear

Renewable

Hydroelectric

Conventional

Pumped-storage

Wind

References 

Power stations
Guangdong